Stick It in Your Ear is Paul Laine's debut album. It was released on 1990 on Elektra Records. It includes the song "Dorianna", that peaked #76 in Canada in late 1990. The second single, "Is It Love", peaked #93 in Canada.

Track listing

Bonus tracks (2011 re-release)

Personnel

Paul Laine - vocals, guitars, keyboards, piano
Kenny Kaos - guitars
Paul Gogo - keyboards, backing vocals
John Webster - keyboards
Scott Brown - bass, backing vocals
Rene Worst - bass, fretless bass
Pat Steward - drums
Mickey Curry - drums
Bruce Fairbairn - piano

References

Paul Laine albums
1990 debut albums
Elektra Records albums